This is a list of public art in the London Borough of Islington.

Barnsbury

Canonbury

Clerkenwell

Farringdon

Finsbury

Finsbury Park

Highbury

Highgate
Highgate is partly located outside the borough of Islington; for works not listed here see the relevant sections for the boroughs of Camden and Haringey.

Holloway

Newington Green

Pentonville

St Luke's

St Mary's

Shoreditch

References

Bibliography

External links
 

Islington
Islington
Tourist attractions in the London Borough of Islington